Samimi is an Iranian surname. Notable people with this surname include:

Abbas Samimi (born 1977), Iranian discus thrower
Alireza Samimi (born 1987), Iranian futsal player
Idin Samimi Mofakham (born 1982), Iranian composer
Kamran Samimi (1925–1981), Iranian academic and translator
Mahmoud Samimi (born 1988), Iranian discus thrower
Mohammad Samimi (born 1987), Iranian discus thrower
Vasfi Samimi (1908–1981), Albanian footballer, writer and doctor

See also